Caroline Lee Bouvier, later Canfield, Radziwiłł, and Ross (March 3, 1933 – February 15, 2019), usually known as Princess Lee Radziwill, was an American socialite, public relations executive, and interior decorator. She was the younger sister of First Lady Jacqueline Bouvier Kennedy and sister-in-law of President John F. Kennedy. Radziwill was married three times, each marriage ending in divorce, with the marriage to third husband Herbert Ross ending in divorce shortly before his death in 2001.

Early life and ancestry 
Caroline Lee Bouvier was born at Doctors Hospital in New York City to stockbroker John Vernou Bouvier III and his wife, socialite Janet Norton Lee. She attended The Chapin School, in New York City, Potomac School in Washington, D.C., Miss Porter's School in Farmington, Connecticut, and pursued undergraduate studies at Sarah Lawrence College. In her birth announcement, and from her earliest years, she was known by her middle name "Lee" rather than Caroline.

Career and fame
In the 1960s, Radziwill attempted to forge a career as an actress. Her acting attempt was unsuccessful, if highly publicized. She starred in the 1967 production of The Philadelphia Story as the spoiled Main Line heiress Tracy Lord. The play was staged at the Ivanhoe Theatre in Chicago, and Radziwill's performance was widely panned. A year later, she appeared in a television adaptation of the 1944 film Laura, which was badly received.

A London townhouse and a manor, Turville Grange (which she shared with her second husband), that she owned had both been decorated by Italian stage designer Lorenzo Mongiardino; they were greatly admired and frequently photographed by Cecil Beaton and Horst P. Horst. She worked briefly as an interior decorator in a style influenced by her association with Mongiardino. Her clientele were the wealthy; she once decorated a house "for people who would not be there more than three days a year". She frequented celebrity company, including travelling with The Rolling Stones during their 1972 tour of North America, which she attended alongside the writer Truman Capote.

Radziwill was named to the Vanity Fair International Best Dressed Hall of Fame in 1996. Her Paris (Avenue Montaigne 49) and Manhattan (160 East 72nd Street) apartments were featured in the April 2009 issue of Elle Décor magazine. She was interviewed by director Sofia Coppola in February 2013 about her life as part of Radziwill's cover story for T: The New York Times Style Magazine as well as about Coppola's film The Bling Ring and the loss of privacy. She was listed as one of the 50 best-dressed people over 50 by The Guardian in March 2013.

Grey Gardens documentary
In 1972, Radziwill hired documentary filmmakers Albert and David Maysles to work on a film about the Bouvier family. At the outset, the brothers filmed two eccentric and reclusive members of the extended family, Edith Ewing Bouvier Beale ("Big Edie") and her daughter Edith Bouvier Beale ("Little Edie"), who were Radziwill's aunt and cousin, respectively. The Beales lived in a rambling, decaying home in East Hampton, New York, and were supported by other members of the family.

Radziwill's original film project was not completed, and Radziwill kept the footage that had been shot of the Beales. However, the Maysles brothers were fascinated by the strange life the two women led, and after raising funds for film and equipment on their own they returned and filmed 70 more hours of footage with Big Edie and Little Edie. The resulting 1975 film Grey Gardens, named after the Beales' home, is widely considered a masterpiece of the documentary genre. It was later adapted as a 2006 musical of the same name, in which the characters Lee and Jackie Bouvier appear as visiting children in retrospect. An HBO television movie based upon the documentary and surrounding story of the Beales' lives, also called Grey Gardens, appeared in 2009.

The original 1972 footage featuring Radziwill visiting with the Beales was released in 2017 as That Summer.

Books

Personal life and death
Radziwill was married three times. Her first marriage, in April 1953, was to Michael Temple Canfield, a publishing executive. They divorced in 1958, and the marriage was declared annulled by the Sacred Rota in November 1962.

Her second marriage, on March 19, 1959, was to the Polish aristocrat Prince Stanisław Albrecht Radziwiłł, who divorced his second wife, the former Grace Maria Kolin, and received a Roman Catholic annulment of his first marriage to re-marry. (His second marriage had never been acknowledged by the Roman Catholic Church, so no annulment was necessary.) Upon her marriage, she became Her Serene Highness Princess Caroline Lee Radziwiłł. (In the Second Polish Republic the privileges of the nobility were legally abolished by the March Constitution in 1921 and as such not reinstated by any succeeding Polish law).  They had two children, Anthony (1959–1999) and Christina (b. 1960). Their marriage ended in divorce in 1974.

In 1976, The New York Times reported Peter Tufo was a "frequent escort" of Radziwill.

On September 23, 1988, Radziwill married for a third time, becoming the second wife of American film director and choreographer Herbert Ross. Their divorce was finalized shortly before his death, and she returned to using Radziwill, the transliteration of her children's name, Radziwiłł.

Radziwill died on February 15, 2019, aged 85, in her apartment on the Upper East Side of Manhattan.  Half of her ashes are buried at the Bouvier family plot at Most Holy Trinity Catholic Cemetery in East Hampton, New York. The other half of her ashes will be scattered in the Mediterranean Sea off the Amalfi Coast per her wishes.

Notes

References

Bibliography 

 
 
 
 Magazine Paris Match July 6, 2008 page 16.

External links 

 

1933 births
2019 deaths
20th-century American actresses
21st-century American actresses
Actresses from New York City
American film actresses
American Roman Catholics
American socialites
American stage actresses
American women interior designers
Bouvier family
Miss Porter's School alumni
People from Southampton (town), New York
People from the Upper East Side
Polish princesses
Princesses by marriage
Sarah Lawrence College alumni